The Grand Lodge of the Dominican Republic is a federation of Masonic lodges with jurisdiction in the Dominican Republic.  Founded October 24, 1858, it holds relations with the United Grand Lodge of England and is a member of the Inter-American Masonic Confederation (Confederación Masónica Interamericana).

External links
https://www.diariolibre.com/opinion/lecturas/logias-masnicas-CVDL29150

References 

Dominican